Fremantle Press (formerly known as Fremantle Arts Centre Press) is an independent publisher in Western Australia. Fremantle Press was established by the Fremantle Arts Centre in 1976. It focuses on publishing Western Australian writers and writing.

It publishes works of fiction, literary prose and poetry, social history, autobiography, biography, trade books in areas such as food and photography, children's picture books and fiction for young readers.

History
The Fremantle Arts Centre Press was started in the mid 70s when it published the first of its books which included a poetry anthology. The first author of a whole book was Elizabeth Jolley who wrote Five Acre Virgin and other Stories which was one her first published works in 1976. Known initially for fiction works they had a substantial financial success with a non-fiction work about an Australian autobiography entitled "A Fortunate Life" written by an 85-year-old Albert Facey. This work was licensed to Penguin books and sold over 750,000 copies. The arrangement with Penguin grew to a permanent distribution deal with the publication of My Place by the indigenous author Sally Morgan in 1987. This was a national success and in 2000 when they published Benang another award-winning novel by the indigenous author Kim Scott.

The press changed its name to the Fremantle Press in 2007.

In the late 1970s and early 1980s the press had a dedicated series edited by William Grono called West Coast Writingof books of short stories and poetry. It included works by Nicholas Hasluck, Tom Hungerford, Alan Alexander, Andrew Burke, Lee Knowles, Alec Choate, Justina Williams, Peter Cowan, Julie Lewis, and James Legasse.

Subsequent published authors include Albert Facey, Sally Morgan, Elizabeth Jolley, Tim Winton, Liz Byrski, Julia Lawrinson, Kim Scott, John Kinsella, John A. Long, Tracy Ryan, Richard Woldendorp, Frances Andrijich, Carolyn Polizzotto, Wayne Ashton, Anna Haebich, Philip Salom, Eoin Cameron, Kate Lamont, Kate McCaffrey, Simon Haynes, Craig Silvey and Stephen Kinnane.

Fremantle Press established the Fogarty Literary Award in association with the Fogarty Foundation in December 2018. This biennial award is for an unpublished manuscript by a Western Australian writer aged 18 to 35 valued at AU$20,000. In addition, the winning author receives a publishing contract for their manuscript.

References

External links

Fremantle
Publishing companies established in 1976
Book publishing companies of Australia
Western Australian literature
1976 establishments in Australia